The Harvard University Police Department (HUPD), a private police agency of Harvard University, is a full-service police department responsible for the safety and security of students, faculty, staff, and visitors at the university’s Cambridge and Boston campuses.  The HUPD’s chief of police, since 1996, is Francis D. “Bud” Riley.  The chief performs his duties under the direction of the university’s general counsel, Robert W. Iuliano.

Divisions 

 Patrol Division
 Criminal Investigation Division
 Dignitary Protection Unit

Law Enforcement Authority 
All sworn members of the Harvard University Police Department are sworn as special state police officers under Massachusetts General Laws Chapter 22C Section 63. This gives them full powers of arrest in and upon all property owned or controlled by Harvard University. Additionally, all officers hold commissions as deputy sheriffs for Middlesex County and Suffolk County, which gives them powers of arrest throughout Cambridge, Somerville, and Boston, where Harvard has facilities.

Police logs controversy 

The HUPD has been the target of requests for greater transparency in the records it keeps or publishes about its officers’ actions. This culminated in The Harvard Crimson v. President and Fellows of Harvard College, et al. in 2003 where the Harvard student daily newspaper filed suit against HUPD in Massachusetts Superior Court.  The case was ultimately transferred to the Massachusetts Supreme Judicial Court and won by the University in January 2006.

See also 
 Campus police
 Cambridge Police Department (Massachusetts)
 Massachusetts Institute of Technology Police Department

References

External links 

 Harvard University Police Department

Police Department, Harvard University
University and college police forces of the United States
School police departments of Massachusetts